Michael Carlin is an Australian art director who was nominated at the 81st Academy Awards for the film The Duchess. He was nominated for Best Art Direction, which his nomination was shared with Rebecca Alleway.

Selected filmography
 What a Girl Wants (2003)
 The Last King of Scotland (2006)
 Mr. Bean's Holiday (2007)
 The Duchess (2008)
 In Bruges (2008)
 Salmon Fishing in the Yemen (2011)
 Red Tails (2012)

References

External links

Living people
Australian art directors
Australian production designers
Year of birth missing (living people)